MeloMance (Hangul: 멜로망스) is a South Korean duo formed by Heaven Company in 2013. The group's name is composed of two words, "melo" and "romance". They debuted on March 10, 2015, with the extended play Sentimental.

Members
 Kim Min-seok (김민석) – vocals
 Jeong Dong-hwan (정동환) – piano

Discography

Extended plays

Singles

Collaboration

Soundtrack appearances

Music videos

Filmography

Drama

Awards and nominations

Notes

References

External links

South Korean musical duos
Musical groups from Seoul
Musical groups established in 2015
2015 establishments in South Korea
Melon Music Award winners